Rock County Airport  is a public use airport located two nautical miles (3.7 km) southwest of the central business district of Bassett, a city in Rock County, Nebraska, United States. It is owned by the Rock County Airport Authority. According to the FAA's National Plan of Integrated Airport Systems for 2009–2013, it is classified as a general aviation airport.

Although many U.S. airports use the same three-letter location identifier for the FAA and IATA, this airport is assigned RBE by the FAA but has no designation from the IATA (which assigned RBE to Ratanakiri Airport in Ratanakiri, Cambodia).

Facilities and aircraft 
It has two runways: 13/31 is 4,699 by 75 feet (1,432 x 23 m) with a concrete surface and 2/20 is 2,202 by 120 feet (671 x 37 m) with a turf surface.

For the 12-month period ending August 19, 2008, the airport had 2,000 general aviation aircraft operations, an average of 166 per month. At that time there were 4 aircraft based at this airport: 100% single-engine.

References

External links 
 Aerial photo as of 17 April 1999 from USGS The National Map
 
 

Airports in Nebraska
Buildings and structures in Rock County, Nebraska